Liz Duffy Adams is an American playwright who has written many plays including Born With Teeth; Or,; Dog Act; The Salonnieres; A Discourse on the Wonders of the Invisible World; The Broken Machine, and others.

Her play  Born With Teeth won a 2021 Edgerton Foundation New Play Award. She was rewarded the 2012 "Women of Achievement Award" from the Women's Project Theater  as well as a 2010 Lily Award and a 2008 Weston Playhouse Music-Theatre Award among other honors.

Early life and education

Adams is an American playwright originally from Ipswich, Massachusetts, though with dual Irish and American citizenship. She has a BFA from NYU's Experimental Theater Wing, and an MFA in Playwriting from Yale School of Drama. She was the 2012–2013 Briggs-Copeland Visiting Lecturer in Playwriting at Harvard University.  She is an alumna of New Dramatists (2001-2008).

Reviews
Charles Isherwood wrote in his New York Times review of her historical play Or, "Ms. Adams fares remarkably well. Her language has a natural period flavor and a formidable wit; her characters possess the spark of fully animated spirits; and she weaves into her story both biographical detail and cultural context with grace."

In the Houston Chronicle, Robert Donahoo wrote of Born with Teeth that it "can’t decide if it is about literature, history, political intrigue,  religious persecution, or the wide varieties of love, and that’s a good —  no, make that glorious — thing. The play grabs them all and squeezes  them into a trim, tight, electric production…. [a] jewel of a script."

The DC Theatre Scene review of her Discourse on the Wonders of the Invisible World, by Debbie Minter Jackson, says, "Adams has a way of transforming ominous situations into thought provoking entertaining experiences, and she handles the premise of the Salem witch trials with care that ends up being thoughtful, mysterious, and if I dare say – startlingly funny."

Robert Hurwitt wrote in his SF Gate review of her Dog Act, "It's a bright dystopian blend of pop and high culture –– Brecht's Mother Courage as a vaudeville troupe leader wandering a Waiting for Godot world as transmuted through generations of Mad Max–Road Warrior movies with some lingering influences from Peter Pan –– peppered with astonishing and exhilarating eruptions of storytelling and wondrous plays within the play."

Notable works
 Born with Teeth premiered at the Alley Theater in Houston, directed by Rob Melrose, in spring 2022
 The Broken Machine was scheduled to premiere at the Magic Theatre, San Francisco, in spring 2021, but was cancelled because of Covid.
 The Salonnières premiered at Greater Boston Stage Company, 2018
Or, premiere Women's Project NYC, 2009, starring Maggie Siff; West Coast premiere at Magic Theater, San Francisco, directed by Loretta Greco 
 A Discourse on the Wonders of the Invisible World premiered at the Contemporary American Theatre Festival, 2012, directed by Kent Nicholson. 
Dog Act, premiere Shotgun Players Berkeley, 2004
One Big Lie (Musical), premiere Crowded Fire, San Francisco, 2005
*Wet, or, Isabella The Pirate Queen Enters The Horse Latitudes, premiere Moxie Theatre, San Diego, 2006
The Listener, premiere Crowded Fire San Francisco, 2008
The Listener of Junk City (Musical) premiere Weston Playhouse, Weston VT, 2008
Buccaneers (with music by Ellen Maddow), premiere Children's Theatre Company, Minneapolis, 2012
The Reckless Ruthless Brutal Charge of It or, the Train Play, premiere Clubbed Thumb NYC, 2002; Crowded Fire, San Francisco 2002
A Fabulous Beast, premiere One Dream Theater NYC, 1994, starring Edie Falco

Awards

Awards include a 2021  Edgerton Foundation New Play Award. 2012 Women of Achievement award from the Women's Project Theater, a 2010 Lily Award for playwrighting, a 2008 Weston Playhouse Music-Theatre award, a 2006 NYFA award, a 2017 Fellowship from the Massachusetts Cultural Council, and the Will Glickman award for Best New Play in 2004 (for Dog Act). She has held residencies at the MacDowell Colony, Millay Colony for the arts, and the Djerassi Resident Artists program. She was profiled in "American Theatre" magazine, December 2004.

Selected works
Or, Dramatists Play Service, Inc., 2011
 Or, in New Playwrights: The Best Plays 2010, Smith and Kraus
 Dog Act in Geek Theater anthology, Underwords Press, 2014
Dog Act, Playscripts, Inc., 2004
New Playwrights: The Best Plays 2010, Smith and Kraus, 2011
 2006: The Best Ten-Minute Plays for 3 or More Actors, Smith and Kraus, 2007
 The Reckless Ruthless Brutal Charge of It, or, The Train Play, Playscripts, Inc. 2002
 Poodle with Guitar and Dark Glasses in Best American Short Plays 2000-2001, Applause Books, 2001
 Poodle with Guitar and Dark Glasses, Playscripts, Inc. 2001
 The Last Woman on Earth, Playscripts, Inc.
 Aphra Does Antwerp, Playscripts, Inc.
 Neon Mirage, Playscripts, Inc.

References

External links
website
New Play Exchange page
  Women Arts Network
  Interview with Adam Szymkowicz
 Or proposal
 New Play Times Interview, 2012
  Seattle Rep interview on Or
  San Francisco Chronicle Top 10 List 2010
All They Need Is Love (review), New York Times.

Living people
Year of birth missing (living people)
American women dramatists and playwrights
Yale School of Drama alumni
Tisch School of the Arts alumni
People from Ipswich, Massachusetts
Writers from Massachusetts
20th-century American dramatists and playwrights
20th-century American women writers
21st-century American dramatists and playwrights
21st-century American women writers